Starry Plough may refer to:

 Starry Plough (flag), a banner of the former Irish Citizen Army, subsequently adopted by other Irish political organizations
 The Starry Plough (magazine), the official magazine (formerly newspaper) of the Irish Republican Socialist Party

See also
 Big Dipper, or The Plough, an asterism consisting of the seven bright stars of the constellation Ursa Major
 The Plough and the Stars, a play by Sean O'Casey based on the Citizen Army's role in the Easter Rising
 The Plough and the Stars, 1937 American film based on the O'Casey play